In Greek mythology, Astraeus or Astraios (Ancient Greek: Ἀστραῖος means "starry") was an astrological deity. Some also associate him with the winds, as he is the father of the four Anemoi (wind deities), by his wife, Eos.

Etymology 
His name “Astraeus” (Ancient Greek , translit. Astraîos) is derived from the Greek word  (astḗr) meaning “star”.  itself is inherited from the Proto-Indo-European root *h₂ster- (“star”), from *h₂eh₁s- , “to burn”. "Astraea" shares this same etymology.

Mythology
According to Hesiod's Theogony and Bibliotheca, Astraeus is a second-generation Titan descended from Crius and Eurybia. However, Hyginus wrote that he was descended directly from Tartarus and Gaia and referred to him as one of the Gigantes. Servius, perhaps conflating him with the Giant like Hyginus did, wrote that he took arms and fought against the gods.

Astraeus married Eos, the goddess of the dawn. Together as nightfall and daybreak, they produced many children associated with what occurs in the sky during twilight.

They had many sons, including the four Anemoi ("winds"): Boreas, Notus, Eurus, and Zephyrus, and the five Astra Planeta ("Wandering Stars", i.e., planets): Phainon (Saturn), Phaethon (Jupiter), Pyroeis (Mars), Eosphoros/Hesperos (Venus), and Stilbon (Mercury).  A few sources mention another daughter, Astraea, the goddess of innocence and, occasionally, justice.

He is also sometimes associated with Aeolus, the Keeper of the Winds, since winds often increase around dusk.

In Nonnus's epic poem Dionysiaca, Astraeus is presented as an oracular god whom the goddess Demeter visits, concerned about her daughter Persephone's future as she had started to attract a significant number of admirers on Olympus and worried that she might end up marrying Hephaestus. Astraeus then warned her that soon enough, Persephone would be ravished by a serpent and bear fruit from that union, which greatly upset Demeter.

Family tree

Notes

References 
 Hard, Robin, The Routledge Handbook of Greek Mythology: Based on H.J. Rose's "Handbook of Greek Mythology", Psychology Press, 2004. . Google Books.
 Nonnus, Dionysiaca; translated by Rouse, W H D, I Books I-XV. Loeb Classical Library No. 344, Cambridge, Massachusetts, Harvard University Press; London, William Heinemann Ltd. 1940. Internet Archive

Titans (mythology)
Greek gods
Stellar gods
Lucifer
Light gods
Oracular gods
Classical oracles
Consorts of Eos
Night gods